Pedro Rubén Rivera Porra (born 27 September 1976) was a Chilean footballer.

He played for Everton.

External links
 
 

1976 births
Living people
Chilean footballers
Cobresal footballers
Ñublense footballers
Coquimbo Unido footballers
Magallanes footballers
Santiago Morning footballers
Everton de Viña del Mar footballers
O'Higgins F.C. footballers
Universidad de Concepción footballers
Chilean Primera División players
Primera B de Chile players
Association football defenders
Magallanes managers